Diana Van der Vlis (June 9, 1935 - October 22, 2001) was a Canadian-American stage, screen and television actress best known for her characters Dr. Nell Beaulac (1975–76) on the ABC soap opera Ryan's Hope and Kate Hathaway Prescott on the soap opera Where the Heart Is. Two other roles on daytime dramas that she played were Sherry Rowan (1987–89) on Ryan's Hope and Susan Ames Carver on The Secret Storm, when she was a substitute for Judy Lewis in the role.

Van der Vlis went to university in Winnipeg, studied at the Royal Academy of Dramatic Arts (RADA) in London and acted in Canada, living in both Clarkson, Mississauga and Vancouver, British Columbia, before booking a role in the Utah-filmed B-movie The Girl in Black Stockings (1957), and moving to New York City in 1956. On arrival, she auditioned for an NBC drama program; there, a page suggested that she try the Baum-Newborn Theatrical Agency.

Within six weeks of arriving in New York City, she was cast in the Broadway show The Happiest Millionaire. While in rehearsals, she reportedly was offered a three-picture non-exclusive film deal with an independent studio and a lead role in a weekly half-hour NBC program filmed in Paris. Her debut, opposite Walter Pidgeon, proved to be a hit. She toured with the show, including to Toronto.

Her subsequent Broadway productions include leading or featured roles in Comes a Day, A Mighty Man Is He, A Shot in the Dark, On an Open Road and The Waltz of the Toreadors.

Diana can be seen in the movies X: The Man with the X-ray Eyes (1963), The Incident (1967), The Swimmer (1968) and Lovespell (1981). She also appears in a 1967 TV film Ghostbreakers.

Van der Vlis guest-starred on numerous primetime TV shows, including Kraft Theatre, Naked City, Tactic, U.S. Steel Hour, DuPont Show of the Month, The DuPont Show of the Week, Alfred Hitchcock Presents, Great Ghost Tales, Brenner, Checkmate, East Side/West Side, Route 66, Dr. Kildare, Flipper, Mr. Broadway, The Defenders, Twelve O'Clock High (as the "commander's pretty wife"), The Invaders, The Man from U.N.C.L.E., T.H.E. Cat, The F.B.I., and The Fugitive.

She was a naturalized U.S. citizen and mother of actor Matthew Powers.

On October 22, 2001, she died in Montana due to a cardiac arrest caused by a pulmonary embolism, following a brief illness.

Filmography

References

External links

 

1935 births
2001 deaths
Canadian television actresses
Canadian people of Dutch descent
Actresses from Toronto
Canadian emigrants to the United States
Alumni of RADA
American soap opera actresses
American people of Dutch descent
Naturalized citizens of the United States
20th-century American actresses